Angélina Lanza (born 6 June 1993) is a French Paralympic athlete who competes in both track and field events.

References

External links 
 
 

1993 births
Living people
French sportspeople of Togolese descent
Athletes from Lyon
Paralympic athletes of France
Athletes (track and field) at the 2016 Summer Paralympics
Athletes (track and field) at the 2020 Summer Paralympics
French female sprinters
French female long jumpers
Naturalized citizens of France
Sportspeople from Lomé